Abu'l-'Anbas Saymari Mohammad bin Eshaq bin Abi'l-'Anbas bin Al-Maghira bin Mahan was an Iranian astrologer, astronomer, poet and author. He was born in 213/828 in Kufa, and died in 275/889. He seems to have spent much of his time at the caliphal court from Motawakkel’s reign (847861) to Moʿtamed’s (870892). His great-great-grandfather’s name, and his knowledge of the Sasanian astrologers Zaradūšt and Bozorjmehr, indicates that he was of Iranian origin.

List of known works
  (Book of the Refutation of Astrologers), lost;
  (Book of Judgements of the Stars), lost;
  (Book of the Introduction to the Art of Astrology), perhaps identical with no. 5;
  (Book of Nativities), lost;
  (Book of the Introduction to the Science of the Stars);
  (Book on Stellar Computation);
 .

References

Sources

Further reading
 

Medieval Iranian astrologers
9th-century Iranian astronomers
Astronomers of the medieval Islamic world